The 1948 Cupa României Final was the 11th final of Romania's most prestigious football cup competition. It was disputed between ITA Arad and CFR Timișoara, and was won by ITA Arad after a game with 5 goals. It was the first cup title in the history of ITA Arad.

Also this final was the first Cupa României final after war and a break of 4 years, last final was disputed exactly 5 years ago on 15 August 1943. The cup was not played in those years because of World War II.

Match details

See also 
List of Cupa României finals

References

External links
Romaniansoccer.ro

1948
Cupa
Romania